Allium ericetorum is a species of onions widespread across much of southern and central Europe, from Portugal to  Ukraine.

Allium ericetorum is a perennial herb growing from a bulb. Scape is up to 50 cm tall, round in cross-section. Umbel is hemispherical, with 15-45 bell-shaped white flowers. Stamens are longer than the tepals, with brown anthers. Ovary is green.

References

External links
 

ericetorum
Onions
Flora of Europe
Plants described in 1803
Taxa named by Carl Linnaeus